Oh Doctor! is a 1925 American silent comedy based on the novel of the same name written by Harry Leon Wilson. It was directed by Harry A. Pollard and stars Reginald Denny and Mary Astor. It was produced and released by Universal Pictures. It has been preserved and is available on DVD.

Plot
Rufus Billops, son of wealthy parents, has been reared to manhood believing he is delicate and sickly. He inherits a huge fortune, but it has been placed in some long-term investments, so for some years he will have only a small income. He borrows from three elderly loan-sharks who wish him to live long enough to obtain his principal (so he can pay them). They supply inspiration in the form of a beautiful nurse. Rufus falls in love with her and finding that she admires daring men, he does some reckless stunts that cause his creditors to almost die from anxiety. Dolores, the nurse, creates a scheme to gain the release of his fortune from the lenders, and Rufus finally wins her affection.
Exhibitors Trade Review (1925)

Cast

Preservation
Prints of Oh Doctor! are held by UCLA Film and Television Archive, Academy Film Archive, and EYE Film Institute Netherlands.

References

External links

Lobby poster at silenthollywood.com

1925 films
American silent feature films
Films based on short fiction
Universal Pictures films
1925 comedy films
Silent American comedy films
American black-and-white films
Films directed by Harry A. Pollard
1920s American films